Announced in 2002, the first DARPA Grand Challenge was a driverless car competition held on March 13, 2004 in the Mojave Desert region of the United States. The  route followed Interstate 15 from just before Barstow, California to just past the California-Nevada border in Primm.
None of the robot vehicles finished the route. The vehicle of Carnegie Mellon University's Red Team traveled the farthest distance, completing  of the course.  The $1 million prize remained unclaimed.

Preliminary tests

Prior to the main event in the Mojave Desert, the twenty-one qualifying teams were required to navigate a mile-long obstacle course at California Speedway.  Seven teams were able to successfully complete the entire course, while eight others completed enough of it to satisfy of the judges, resulting in fifteen vehicles in the final race.

The event
Unfortunately, the failures during the preliminary tests were indicative of how the vehicles would perform on the actual course.  Two of the fifteen vehicles had to be withdrawn before the final race began and one car flipped upside down in the starting area and had to be withdrawn. Three hours into the event that was scheduled to last ten hours, only four vehicles remained operational.  The vehicles suffered from a variety of mechanical problems, including "stuck brakes, broken axles, rollovers, and malfunctioning satellite navigation equipment."

Within a few hours, all of the vehicles in the challenge had suffered critical vehicle failures, had been disqualified, or had withdrawn. The farthest any of the teams got was the Red Team's , less than 5% off the full length of the course.  Their vehicle, Sandstorm, went off-course in a hairpin turn and got stuck on the embankment.  The next farthest vehicles were those of the SciAutonics II Team, which traversed  before becoming stuck on an embankment; Team DAD (Digital Auto Drive), which drove  before getting stuck on a rock; and the Golem Group, which made it  before becoming trapped on a steep hill.

The results

Although the initial race was deemed a failure, as no vehicles achieved anything close to the goal, DARPA was committed to running the challenge for as long as Congressional authority allowed (which would have been until 2007, but the goal was reached in 2005). The first Grand Challenge is considered by some to be a success, mainly because it spurred interest and innovation.

In addition to the difficulty many vehicles had with the harsh terrain, many initial designs also struggled to handle both sensing upcoming obstacles and following the GPS waypoints simultaneously. DARPA Grand Challenge deputy program manager Tom Strat said, "some of the vehicles were able to follow the GPS waypoints very accurately; but were not able to sense obstacles ahead....Other vehicles were very good at sensing obstacles, but had difficulty following waypoints or were scared of their own shadow, hallucinating obstacles when they weren't there."

Several teams returned the next year, learning from the 2004 event and updating their designs.

References

External links

Official sites
The home page of the 2004 DARPA Grand Challenge
DGC-2004 Teams

TV & Video coverage
NOVA: The Great Robot Race

Press Coverage
 The Register: Final robot grunts picked for $1million DARPA race
 The Register: DARPA's Grand Challenge proves to be too grand
 CNN.com: Robots fail to complete Grand Challenge
 SFGate.com: Robot race suffers quick, ignoble end
 2004 DARPA Grand Challenge Image Gallery
 2004 DARPA Grand Challenge in Spanish
 Journal of Field Robotics, Special Issue on DARPA Grand Challenge, Part 1 
 Journal of Field Robotics, Special Issue on DARPA Grand Challenge, Part 2 
 Popular Mechanics article on the DARPA Grand Challenge.
 Popular Science article on the DARPA Grand Challenge.
 Scientific American article on the DARPA Grand Challenge.
 NOVA: The Great Robot Race

Team Sites